Hypermnestre (Hypermnestra) is an opera by the French composer Charles-Hubert Gervais, first performed at the Académie Royale de Musique (the Paris Opera) on 3 November 1716. It takes the form of a tragédie en musique in a prologue and five acts. The libretto, by Joseph de Lafont, concerns the Greek myth of Hypermnestra.

Discography 

 Hypermnestre, Katherine Watson, Hypermnestre, Mathias Vidal, Lyncée, Thomas Dolié, Danaüs, Philippe-Nicolas Martin, Arcas (ombre de Gélanor, le Nil), Chantal Santon-Jeffery, (NaÏade, bergère, Coryphée), Juliette Mars, (Isis, matelote), Manuel Nuñez Camelino (Grand Prêtre, Coryphée), Purcell Choir, Orfeo Orchestra, conducted by Giörgy Vashegyi. 2 CD Glossa 2019. 5 Diapasons.

Sources
 Jean-Paul C. Montagnier, « Les deux versions du cinquième acte d’Hypermnestre de Charles-Hubert Gervais », Revue de musicologie, 82 (1996), pp. 331-343.
 Jean-Paul C. Montagnier, Charles-Hubert Gervais (1671-1744), un musicien au service du Régent et de Louis XV. Paris: CNRS Editions, 2001.
 Libretto at "Livrets baroques"
 Félix Clément and Pierre Larousse Dictionnaire des Opéras, Paris, 1881, page 349

French-language operas
Tragédies en musique
Operas by Charles Hubert Gervais
Operas
1716 operas